John Michael Willson  (15 July 1931 –17 April 2013) was a British diplomat. He served as ambassador to the Ivory Coast, Burkina Faso and Niger from 1983 to 1987 and high commissioner to Zambia from 1988 to 1990. He was appointed Companion of the Order of St Michael and St George (CMG) in 1988.

References

1931 births
2013 deaths
Members of HM Diplomatic Service
Ambassadors of the United Kingdom to Ivory Coast
High Commissioners of the United Kingdom to Zambia
Companions of the Order of St Michael and St George
20th-century British diplomats